"You Better Be Sure" is a song recorded by Canadian country music artist Shirley Myers. It was released in 1999 as the second single from her second studio album, There Will Come a Day. It peaked at number 10 on the RPM Country Tracks chart in January 2000.

Chart performance

References 

1999 songs
1999 singles
Shirley Myers songs
Song recordings produced by Keith Olsen
Songs written by Shirley Myers
Stony Plain Records singles